Curlew is the common name for a group of birds of the family Scolopacidae.

Curlew may also refer to:

Music
The Curlew, song cycle by Peter Warlock written between 1920 and 1922
Curlew (band), an American jazz group
Curlew (album), a 1981 album by Curlew
Curlew River, a 1964 opera by Benjamin Britten

Places
Curlew Island (disambiguation)

Canada
Curlew, Alberta, a locality in Kneehill County, Alberta

United States
Curlew, Iowa, a city in Palo Alto County, Iowa
Curlew, Kentucky, an unincorporated community in Union County, Kentucky
Curlew, Washington, an unincorporated community and census-designated place in Ferry County, Washington,

Ships
Curlew (steamboat), an American steamer completed in 1856 and sunk in 1863
CSS Curlew, a Confederate States Navy gunboat commissioned in 1861 and burned in 1862
, a Royal Canadian Navy minesweeper and patrol vessel commissioned in 1914 and sold in 1921
, various ships of the British Royal Navy
, a fishery vessel in the fleet of the United States Bureau of Fisheries
, various United States Navy ships

Aircraft
CLW Curlew, a British training aircraft of the 1930s

See also

Curlee (disambiguation)
Curler (disambiguation)
Curley (disambiguation)